Shri Ramkrishna Institute of Medical Sciences and Sanaka Hospital is a private (50 government seats) medical college located in Durgapur, West Bengal. It was established in 2015.

About the college
The institute offers undergraduate seats for MBBS (150 seats) which are recognised by the Medical Council of India. This medical college also has a 385-bedded functional hospital which would be upgraded to 750 bedded within 5 years, named Sanaka Hospital, with facilities consisting of minor and major O.T., PICU, NICU, ICCU and ICU. It has got MCI permission to start its MBBS course in 2019. This medical college has its own nursing and paramedical college also.

In 2020, during the coronavirus (COVID-19) outbreak, Sanaka hospital was converted into a COVID hospital by the government of West Bengal and the nodal center for 5 districts namely Paschim Burdwan, purba Burdwan, Bishnupur, Purulia, Bankura. It has treated many COVID patients and played a pivotal role in suppression of the pandemic in South Bengal. AIIMS, Bhubaneswar has recommended ICMR for permitting this college to start COVID-19 testing and it has got NABH accreditation and ICMR permission for covid testing in its own laboratory. It already dedicated 400 bed to government patients for free treatment and has 76 ccu dedicated to covid patients.

Outpatient Department doctor consultation fees in this medical college hospital is only Rs 50. It has a 250-seat examination hall in its college building. It also has dialysis facility inside the seven storey hospital. It is locally known as sanaka medical college.

It is one of the 23 medical colleges teaching MBBS in West Bengal. Its first MBBS batch will graduate in 2025.

Department include:
Anatomy
Physiology
Biochemistry
Pathology
Microbiology
Pharmacology
Community Medicine
General Medicine
General Surgery
Orthopaedic
ENT
Ophthalmology
Radiology

It contains one super speciality department:
Nephrology

See also
Healthcare in India
List of hospitals in India
Bengal Homoeopathic Medical College and Hospital

References

External links
 https://srims.setgoi.ac.in/

Medical colleges in West Bengal
Affiliates of West Bengal University of Health Sciences
2015 establishments in West Bengal
Hospitals established in 2015
Educational institutions established in 2015
Hospitals in West Bengal
Education in Durgapur, West Bengal